Charlet is a French surname. Notable people with the surname include:

 Adolphe Charlet (1908-2009) French sculptor
 Armand Charlet (1900–1975), French mountain climber and guide
 Blanche Charlet (1898–1985), British agent and French resistance fighter in World War II
 Étienne Charlet (1756–1795), French general of the French Revolutionary Wars
 Isabella Charlet-Straton (1838–1918), British mountain climber
 Julien Charlet, French curler and coach 
 Nicolas Toussaint Charlet (1792–1845), French painter of military subjects 
 René Charlet (1903–?), French bobsledder
 Laurent Charlet (b. 1955), French geochemist

French-language surnames